Pandev is a Macedonian surname, it may refer to:

Goran Pandev (born 1983), Macedonian footballer playing for Genoa
Riste Pandev (born 1991), Macedonian sprinter
Saško Pandev (born 1987), Macedonian footballer playing for FK Turnovo

Macedonian-language surnames